The Mermaid Reef Marine Park (previously known as the Mermaid Reef Marine National Nature Reserve) is an Australian marine park in the Rowley Shoals, located approximately  north-west of Broome, Western Australia. It is one of 13 parks managed under the North-west Marine Parks Network, and lies adjacent to the Argo-Rowley Terrace Marine Park

Conservation values

Species and habitat
Important areas for sharks including the grey reef shark, the whitetip reef shark and the silvertip whaler.
Important foraging area for marine turtles.
Important area for toothed whales, dolphins, tuna and billfish.
Important resting and feeding sites for migratory seabirds
The reserve, along with the adjacent Rowley Shoals Marine Park, provides the best geological example of shelf atolls in Australia

Ecology and bioregion
Mermaid Reef has national and international significance due to its pristine character, coral formations, geomorphic features and diverse marine life. It is a key area for over 200 species of hard corals and 12 classes of soft corals with coral formations in pristine condition.
Examples of the seafloor habitats and communities of the Northwest Transition provincial bioregion.

History
The Marine Park was originally proclaimed on 10 April 1991 as the Mermaid Reef Marine National Nature Reserve. It was proclaimed as a Commonwealth Marine Reserve in 2013 and later renamed Mermaid Reef Marine Park on 9 October 2017.

Summary of protection zones
The Mermaid Reef Marine park has been assigned IUCN protected area category II and is wholly zoned as a National Park.

The following table is a summary of the zoning rules within the Mermaid Reef Marine Park:

See also

 Protected areas managed by the Australian government

References

External links

 North-west Marine Parks Network - Parks Australia
 North-west Commonwealth Marine Reserves Network - environment.gov.au (outdated)

Australian marine parks